Ganj Basoda railway station  is a railway station in Vidisha district of Madhya Pradesh. The station is located in the city of Ganj Basoda, situated on the New Delhi–Chennai main line. Its code is BAQ. It is connected to the major cities of India by the railway network.

Ganj Basoda is well connected to New Delhi, Bhopal, Varanasi, Jhansi, Mumbai, Chennai, Howrah, Gaya, Indore, Hyderabad, Jaipur, Jodhpur, Amritsar, Somnath, Kota, Jabalpur, Nagpur and Bilaspur.

Structure
The railway station consists of four platforms. The platforms are well furnished and interconnect foot over bridges and it provides the following facilities:

 Gents waiting halls
 Ladies waiting halls
 Electronic Train Indicator
 Reserved computerised ticket counters
 Un-reserved computerised ticket counters
 Parking

References

Railway stations in Vidisha district
Bhopal railway division